Something Special is an album by the American folk music group  the Kingston Trio, released in 1962 (see 1962 in music). It reached number 7 on the Billboard Pop Albums chart. The lead-off single was a non-album track "C'mon Betty Home" b/w "Old Joe Clark". "One More Town" b/w "She Was Too Good to Me" was released as a single later the same year. Neither single made the Top 40. Something Special was nominated for a Grammy Award in the Best Folk Recording category.

A notable feature of Something Special is that it was highly orchestrated, using strings, brass instruments and a choir.

Reception

Allmusic music critic Bruce Eder wrote the album "was the oddest of all the Kingston Trio's albums... a marked departure from previous work by the trio... The results aren't bad so much as they are strange at times."

Reissues
Something Special was reissued along with Back in Town on CD by Collectors Choice Records in 2000. A bonus track, "C'mon Betty Home" is included.
In 2000, all of the tracks from Something Special were included in The Stewart Years 10-CD box set issued by Bear Family Records. This collection also includes eleven tracks without Jimmie Haskell's orchestral overdubs; the twelfth cut, "Old Joe Clark," appeared on the album as it was originally recorded.

Track listing

Side one

 "Brown Mountain Light" (Scotty Wiseman) – 2:48
 "One More Town" (John Stewart) – 2:57
 "Oh Willow Waley" (Georges Auric, Paul Dehan) – 2:46
 "Tell it on the Mountain" (Traditional, Nick Reynolds, Bob Shane, Stewart) – 1:55
 "Little Boy" (Mike Settle) – 2:33
 "Strange Day" (Stewart, George Yanok) – 3:55

Side two

 "Away Rio" (Reynolds, Shane, Stewart) – 2:57
 "Pullin' Away" (Reynolds, Shane, Stewart) – 3:17
 "She Was Too Good To Me (Richard Rodgers, Lorenz Hart) – 2:46
 "Jane, Jane, Jane" (Stan Wilson) – 2:51
 "Portland Town" (Stewart) – 1:59
 "Old Joe Clark" (Traditional) – 1:58

Personnel
Bob Shane – vocals, guitar
Nick Reynolds – vocals, tenor guitar, bongos, conga
John Stewart – vocals, banjo, guitar
Dean Reilly – bass

Production notes
Voyle Gilmore – producer
Pete Abbott – engineer
Jimmie Haskell – arrangements, conductor

Chart positions

References

1962 albums
The Kingston Trio albums
Albums produced by Voyle Gilmore
Capitol Records albums
Albums conducted by Jimmie Haskell
Albums arranged by Jimmie Haskell
Collectors' Choice Music albums